"One Step Back" is a song recorded by Canadian country music artist Jamie Warren. It was released in 1996 as the third single from his debut album, Fallen Angel. It peaked at number 4 on the RPM Country Tracks chart in June 1996.

Chart performance

Year-end charts

References

1996 songs
1996 singles
Jamie Warren songs